Trychnomera is a genus of moths of the family Yponomeutidae.

Species
Trychnomera anthemis - Turner, 1913 

Yponomeutidae